The Roseau River is a  tributary of the Red River of the North, in southern Manitoba in Canada and northwestern Minnesota in the United States. Via the Red River, Lake Winnipeg and the Nelson River, it is part of the watershed of Hudson Bay.

The name is from the French for reed, roseau, in turn from the Ojibwe Ga-shashagunushkokawi-sibi, "place-of-rushes river."

The river flows through the Roseau River Anishinabe First Nation.  It is also the namesake for the community of Roseau River in Manitoba.

See also
List of Manitoba rivers
List of Minnesota rivers
List of longest streams of Minnesota

References

External links
 Roseau River Watershed at the Minnesota Pollution Control Agency

Rivers of Kittson County, Minnesota
Rivers of Roseau County, Minnesota
Rivers of Beltrami County, Minnesota
Rivers of Lake of the Woods County, Minnesota
Rivers of Manitoba
Rivers of Minnesota
International rivers of North America
Tributaries of the Red River of the North

Bodies of water of Eastman Region, Manitoba